Cornovichthys is an extinct genus of jawless fish in the super class Anaspidomorphi. It is known from the Middle Devonian of Scotland.

Cornovichthys is also classified as a rare agnathan and shares similarities with the fauna found in the Late Devonian Escuminac Formation of Canada. The passage also states that while Cornovichthys may have been widespread in the Silurian and Devonian periods, it is only found when preserved under exceptional circumstances.

References

External links 

Anaspidomorphi genera
Fossil taxa described in 2001